The Clausura 2015 Copa MX Final was the final of the Clausura 2015 Copa MX, the sixth edition of the Copa MX under its current format and 73rd overall organized by the Mexican Football Federation, the governing body of association football in Mexico.

The final was contested in a single leg format between Liga MX clubs, Puebla and Guadalajara. The leg was hosted by Puebla at their temporary home at Estadio Universitario BUAP in Puebla, Puebla on April 21, 2015. The winner earned a spot to face Santos Laguna (the winner of the Apertura edition) in the 2015 Supercopa MX to qualify as Mexico 3 to the 2016 Copa Libertadores.

Venue
Due to the tournament's regulations the higher seed among both finalists during the group stage would host the final, thus Estadio Universitario BUAP (Puebla's temporary home) hosted the final.

Background
Before the final, Puebla had won the tournament four times, while Guadalajara has won it twice. Before reaching this final, the last time Guadalajara reached a final of any kind was the 2010 Copa Libertadores Finals where they lost to Internacional of Brazil 5–3 on aggregate. Puebla on the other hand reached the finals of the most recent edition of Copa MX, losing 4–2 on penalties to Santos Laguna following a 2–2 draw.

Puebla won four, drew one and lost one group stage match and scored 11 goals during group stage, as they were seeded second. They eliminated Mérida in the quarterfinals and Monterrey in the semifinals.

Guadalajara won four, drew one and lost one group stage match and scored seven goals, as they were seeded fifth, they eliminated Querétaro on penalty kicks in the quarterfinals and Chiapas in the semifinals.

Road to the finals

Note: In all results below, the score of the finalist is given first.

Match

References

Copa MX Finals
2014–15 in Mexican football
Club Puebla  matches
C.D. Guadalajara matches